Smarsh is a multinational "software as a service" (SaaS) company headquartered in Portland, Oregon, with nine offices worldwide including locations in, New York, Redwood City, California, Boston, Raleigh, North Carolina, London and Bangalore, India. The company provides comprehensive archiving and has compliance, supervision and e-discovery solutions for companies in highly regulated industries, including public sector and financial services.

History
The company was founded in Brooklyn, New York in 2001.  The founder, Stephen Marsh, believed that the financial industry needed a better way to archive, store, and regulate its data as regulations required.  In 2004, the company relocated its headquarters to Portland, Oregon.

In 2012, Quest Software, which owned 60% of Smarsh, was sold to Dell Computer. In 2013, Dell sold its stake to California investment firm Toba Capital.

In 2015, the company used its social media archiving tools to assist with a study on the use of social media by adolescents. Smarsh was contracted by CNN to host a secure server where social media use by participating students was monitored and analyzed. The Anderson Cooper 360° special report, #Being13: Inside the Secret World of Teens, was released in October 2015, and won an Emmy Award in the News and Documentary category.

Acquisitions
Smarsh has acquired a number of companies since its start in 2001. In 2008, it acquired the Connecticut-based CentraScan LLC, an email management service and the California-based Financial Visions Inc., a website compliance company.  In early 2012, the company acquired Perpetually, known for its web archiving technology. Smarsh acquired Presensoft, a cloud-based instant message archiving company, in 2015, and in December 2016, it acquired MobileGuard, a mobile communication monitoring and retention provider. In 2017, Smarsh acquired London-based company, Cognia, to improve Smarsh’s voice communication capabilities for mobile and landline devices. In 2018, K1 Investment Management acquired Actiance Inc. Shortly after the acquisition, Actiance was integrated into the Smarsh brand. In 2020, Smarsh acquired Entreda, an integrated cybersecurity risk and compliance management software and services company, which  will continue to operate under its own brand as a stand-alone, wholly owned subsidiary of Smarsh.

Awards and recognition
Smarsh has been named to the Inc. 5000 list of fastest growing private companies in America consecutively from 2008 through 2022.  The company also made the Deloitte Fast 500 list from 2009 through 2015. In 2014, Smarsh Founder, Stephen Marsh won the Financial Technologies Forum's Person of the Year award.  Smarsh was named a leader in the 2015, 2016, 2017, 2018, and 2019 Gartner Magic Quadrant for Enterprise Information Archiving.

References

Software companies based in Oregon
Companies established in 2001
Companies based in Portland, Oregon
2011 establishments in Oregon
Software companies of the United States